Kettenis is a village in the municipality of Eupen, East Belgium.

References 

Eupen
Former municipalities of the German-speaking Community